The Gentle Storm Exclusive Tour CD is a cover EP and the first release of the Dutch heavy metal/folk band The Gentle Storm. It is entirely acoustic, and features only bandleaders Arjen Anthony Lucassen and Anneke van Giersbergen, and drummer Rob Snijders.

The EP could initially only be bought at shows during the small acoustic tour preceding the release of The Diary in February 2015, but was made available through Lucassen and van Giersbergen's websites from April of the same year. It does not feature any songs from The Diary, instead consisting of five cover songs, including some from Lucassen's other project Ayreon, all three of which were already originally featuring van Giersbergen.

Track listing

Personnel 
The Gentle Storm
 Arjen Anthony Lucassen - vocals, acoustic guitars, acoustic bass guitar, mandolin, percussion, hammered dulcimer
 Anneke van Giersbergen - vocals

Additional musicians
 Rob Snijders - drums, percussion

 Production
 Arjen Anthony Lucassen - production, mixing
 Brett Caldas-Lima - mastering

External links 
 Arjen Lucassen's official website

References 

2015 debut albums